Lake Henshaw is a reservoir in San Diego County, California

It drains an area of  square miles at the source of the San Luis Rey River.

It is owned by the Vista Irrigation District and used primarily for agricultural irrigation.

The lake features opportunities for catfish and carp fishing. Boats and cabins are available for rental. It hosts The Carp Throwdown fly fishing tournament organized by The Fly Stop.

See also
List of dams and reservoirs in California
List of lakes in California

References

External links

Dams in California
United States local public utility dams
Henshaw, Lake
Henshaw, Lake
Henshaw